Camden Township is a rural township in Carver County, Minnesota, United States. The population was 955 as of the 2000 census.

History
Camden Township was organized in 1859, and probably named after Camden, New Jersey.

Geography

The southwest quarter of the city of Mayer and the entire city of New Germany are located within the township geographically but are separate entities.

Township 116 North, Range 26 West, Fifth Principal Meridian of the Public Land Survey System.

Lakes
 Baylor Lake
 Berliner Lake
 Eagle Lake
 Smith Lake

Adjacent townships
 Hollywood Township (north)
 Waconia Township (east)
 Benton Township (southeast)
 Young America Township (south)
 Helen Township, McLeod County (southwest)
 Bergen Township, McLeod County (west)

Cemeteries
The township contains two cemeteries: Crow River and Saint Mark.

Major highway
  Minnesota State Highway 25

Demographics

As of the census of 2000, there were 955 people, 316 households, and 269 families residing in the township. There were 327 housing units at an average density of 9.6/sq mi (3.7/km). The racial makeup of the township was 98.01% White, 0.73% African American, 0.10% Native American, 0.10% Asian, and 1.05% from two or more races. Hispanic or Latino of any race were 0.42% of the population.

There were 316 households, out of which 43.0% had children under the age of 18 living with them, 78.2% were married couples living together, 3.5% had a female householder with no husband present, and 14.6% were non-families. 12.7% of all households were made up of individuals, and 6.0% had someone living alone who was 65 years of age or older.  The average household size was 3.02 and the average family size was 3.32.

In the township the population was spread out, with 29.3% under the age of 18, 7.2% from 18 to 24, 28.3% from 25 to 44, 24.8% from 45 to 64, and 10.4% who were 65 years of age or older.  The median age was 37 years. For every 100 females, there were 109.0 males.  For every 100 females age 18 and over, there were 108.3 males.

The median income for a household in the township was $60,563, and the median income for a family was $62,188. Males had a median income of $35,714 versus $31,058 for females. The per capita income for the township was $23,502.  About 2.2% of families and 2.9% of the population were below the poverty line, including 3.8% of those under age 18 and 2.9% of those age 65 or over.

Politics

References
 United States National Atlas
 United States Census Bureau 2007 TIGER/Line Shapefiles
 United States Board on Geographic Names (GNIS)

Townships in Carver County, Minnesota
Townships in Minnesota